Patrol Squadron Eight (VP-8) is a U.S. Navy land-based patrol squadron stationed at Naval Air Station Jacksonville, Florida (USA).  VP-8 is tasked to undertake maritime patrol, anti-submarine warfare (ASW), and intelligence, surveillance and reconnaissance (ISR) missions. The Squadron is equipped with the Boeing P-8A Poseidon.

The squadron was originally established as Patrol Squadron 201 (VP-201) on 1 September 1942, redesignated Patrol Bombing Squadron 201 (VPB-201) on 1 October 1944, redesignated Patrol Squadron 201 (VP-201) on 15 May 1946, redesignated Patrol Squadron, Medium Seaplane 1 (VP-MS-1) on 15 November 1946, redesignated Patrol Squadron, Medium Landplane 8 (VP-ML-8) on 5 June 1947 and redesignated Patrol Squadron 8 (VP-8) on 1 September 1948. It is the second squadron to be designated VP-8, the first VP-8 was redesignated VP-24 on 1 July 1939.

Operational history

World War II

VP-201 was established at NAS Norfolk, Virginia on 1 September 1942, under the operational command of FAW5, flying PBM-3 Mariner seaplanes. The squadron was sent on 6 October 1942 to NAS Banana River, Florida, where most of the operational unit training was undertaken. The squadron received its own new PBM-3C aircraft on 1 December 1942.

On 6 February 1943 VP-201 returned to its home port at NAS Norfolk. Flight crew training continued concurrently with patrol operations along the Atlantic seaboard as a part of Task Force 28 in the Eastern Sea Frontier. On 27 May 1943 the squadron's PBM-3C aircraft were replaced by the newer PBM-3S with improved radar. After refitting, a six-aircraft detachment deployed to NAS Bermuda. On 9 July 1943 Lieutenant Soverel and crew attacked U-134 off Bermuda, the submarine, caught on the surface, manned its potent anti-aircraft (AA) defenses and heavily damaged the PBM-3S, forcing it to return to base. As a result of this encounter, subsequent patrols were made in pairs of aircraft. On 30 July 1943 VP-201 held a change of command at NAS Norfolk, the former commanding officer, Lieutenant Commander M. H. Tuttle, and half of the squadron personnel and assets were transferred to form the cadre of a new PB4Y-1 Liberator squadron, VB-111, the remainder of the squadron and its newly assigned personnel were transferred the next week to a new home port at NAS Bermuda under the administrative control of the Commander Bermuda Air Group. An intensive period of training ensued.

On 8 June 1944 VP-201 was transferred back to its original home port at NAS Norfolk under the administrative control of FAW-5, and assigned duties involving regular flights between Bermuda and Norfolk carrying supplies and personnel. On 12 June the squadron deployed to NAS Key West, Florida, under the operational control of FAW-12 for a two-week period of Anti-submarine warfare (ASW) refresher training. On 12 July VP-201 deployed to NAS Coco Solo, Panama Canal Zone, under the operational control of FAW-3 under the Commander Panama Sea Frontier. Upon completion of
the deployment, the squadron was reassigned to a new home port at NAS Key West under control of FAW-12, on 27 July 1944. From 1 November half of the squadron's PBM-3S aircraft were outfitted with L-8C Leigh searchlights at NAS Key West. After training in use of the new British-designed equipment, the squadron was assigned routine operational flights involving ASW patrols and convoy escort.

From 1 April 1945 squadron flight crews were divided into three sections and sent in rotation to Harvey Point, North Carolina, to pick up replacement aircraft, the PBM-5. Familiarization training on the new seaplanes was conducted at Harvey Point before sending the section back to NAS Key West. On 29 May VPB-201 was transferred to a new home port at NAS Coco Solo, under the operational control of FAW-3. The squadron engaged in ASW, searchlight tactics, gunnery, bombing, and instrument training flights. Following the end of World War II, the squadron's aircraft inventory was reduced from 15 to 9 and it also experienced a reduction in personnel due to the postwar demobilization.

Cold War

1946–1949

On 15 March 1946 VPB-201 was assigned a new home port at NS San Juan, Puerto Rico, under the operational control of FAW-11. The squadron was supported by  during the relocation from Panama to Puerto Rico. Upon arrival, a detachment of three aircraft was sent to NAS Trinidad to serve as part of the Air Sea Rescue Task Unit.

In December 1947 VP-ML-8 received its first contingent of replacement aircraft, the new P2V-2 Neptune. The squadron, home ported at NAS Norfolk, was under the control of FAW-5. A period of transition training commenced for the switch from seaplanes to landplanes.

On 1 March 1949 VP-8 deployed to NAS Argentia, Newfoundland. The primary emphasis during this tour of duty was the testing of the P2V aircraft in cold weather conditions, flying in temperatures as low as -55 °F. Aircrews received training in instrument and night flying and GCA landings.

1950–1959

VP-8 made its first deployment to NAS Argentia with it new P2V-5F aircraft July 15, 1955 Detachments from the squadron operated out of Goose Bay, Frobisher Bay, and Thule, Greenland, providing air cover to supply convoys for Distant Early Warning (DEW) radar installations.

In April 1958, VP-8 transferred to its new home base at Chincoteague, Virginia, and began operating with Task Force Alfa, a Hunter-Killer (HUK) group created to develop improved ASW tactics and technology by integrating carrier-based ASW aircraft, land-based patrol aircraft, refitted destroyers, and hunter-killer submarines into a single task force structure.

During the next two years, VP-8 actively participated in the evolution of antisubmarine warfare, to including the development and evaluation of new tactics and equipment.

1960–1969

The VP-8 moved to Naval Air Station Patuxent River, Maryland in July 1961. After relinquishing the last of its P2V-5FS aircraft to the U. S. Naval Reserve in October 1962, VP-8 became the first operational P-3A Orion squadron in the U.S. Navy.

During the Cuban Missile Crisis, VP-8 sent a four-aircraft detachment to Bermuda to support the naval quarantine, including monitoring of Soviet submarines operating in the Caribbean and Eastern Atlantic.  VP-8 subsequently deployed detachments to Iceland, Ireland, Newfoundland, Bermuda, and Caribbean bases.

VP-8 made the first trans-Atlantic flight by a P-3 Orion when it flew to West Malling, England, on March 9, 1963.  During 1964, VP-8 participated in Fleet Exercise Steel Pike I from bases in Spain.  The squadron also began its first P-3B Orion aircraft in December 1965.

VP-8 made its first deployment to the Western Pacific when it relieved VP-28 at Naval Station Sangley Point, Republic of the Philippines, on May 25, 1966.  During this deployment, VP-8 carried out combat missions throughout Southeast Asia for the U.S. Seventh Fleet in support of the Vietnam War.

1970–1979

From 1969 to 1974, VP-8 made several deployments to Bermuda, and it was transferred to its current homeport at Naval Air Station Brunswick, Maine, in July 1971.

From March 1 to March 2, 1972, P-3A Orion aircraft from VP-8 maintained a constant surveillance of the stricken Soviet nuclear-powered ballistic missile submarine K-19 which had been forced to surface because of an onboard fire that broke out  on February 24.

Starting in February 1976, VP-8 closed out the decade with a number of split deployments.

The squadron suffered the loss of an aircraft and aircrew in the fall of 1978. The aircraft, on route to a Canadian airshow, suffered catastrophic engine damage about 20 minutes into the flight and crashed near Poland Springs Maine.

1980–1991
From 1980 through 1988, VP08 carried out deployments to Rota, Lajes, Bermuda, and Sigonell.  Its deployment to Sigonella included VP-8 participating in numerous ASW exercises with detachments operating out of Rota, Souda Bay, Crete, and Nîmes-Garon, France.

Between October 27 to December 8, 1985, a two-aircraft detachment on rotation at Roosevelt Roads Naval Station, Puerto Rico, assisted the U.S. Coast Guard in anti-drug interdiction operation the Caribbean Sea.

Operation Desert Storm
Starting December 31, 1990, VP-8 deployed to Jeddah, Saudi Arabia, to support carrier battle groups for Operation Desert Shield and Operation Desert Storm, as well as monitor Soviet, Libyan, and Iraqi naval units in the Mediterranean from Naval Air Station Sigonella in coordination with U.S. Sixth Fleet carrier battle groups.

Post-Cold War

1992–Present

Military operations
In January 1996, VP-8 returned from NAS Sigonella where they flew more than 900 sorties and 6,000 hours in support of Operation Sharp Guard and Operation Decisive Endeavor.

During its 1997 deployment to NAS Sigonella, VP-8 flew over 100 missions supporting the United Nations’ peacekeeping effort in Bosnia-Herzegovina (Operation Deliberate Guard) and 42 missions in support of Operation Silver Wake  resulting in the safe evacuation of 889 civilians from Albania.

During its 1998 deployment to NAF Keflavik, NS Roosevelt Roads, and Howard AFB, VP-8 conducted surface and sub-surface surveillance operations in the North Atlantic resulted in tracking 18 individual submarines from eight different countries.  Following its return to NAS Brunswick, VP-8 began the transition to Aircraft Improvement Program (AIP) P-3 upgrade aircraft.  During its 2000 deployment, the squadron's new P-3C AIP aircraft flew over 545 missions, consisting of 5300 hours, out of NAF Sigonella in support of Operation Joint Guardian, Operation Determined Forge, and Operation Deliberate Forge.

Counter-narcotic operations
Operating out of Naval Station Roosevelt Roads between July 1992 and January 1993, VP-8 flew over 6,000 hours in support of counter-narcotic operations and Sixth Fleet operations in the Mediterranean, with several detachment stationed at Naval Station Guantanamo Bay, Naval Air Station Key West, NAS Sigonella, and Naval Air Facility Lajes.

VP-8 flew nearly 6,000 hours operating out of 18 countries during a tri-site deployment to NAF Keflavik, NS Roosevelt Roads, and Howard Air Force Base, Panama, in 1998. The squadron flew 450 surveillance missions in support of counter-narcotic operations in the Caribbean area of responsibility (AOR), resulting in 13 arrests and the seizure of 11 metric tons of illegal drugs worth US$171.4 million. Search and rescue efforts in the region accounted for 14 saved lives.

Operating in a split deployment to NAS Roosevelt Roads from August 2001 to February 2002, VP-8 was active in counter-drug operations in the Caribbean, working with the Coast Guard and U.S. Customs, which interdicted or disrupted $7.6 billion in illegal drugs, including over 28,000 kg of cocaine.

From NAF Keflavik, the squadron participated in NATO exercises, as well as undertaking new operational tasks involving homeland defense and Operation Enduring Freedom.

Operation Iraqi Freedom

From February to August 2003, VP-8 deployed to NAF Sigonella and Souda Bay, Crete, to provide 24-hour P-3 support for the two carrier battle groups in the Mediterranean during Operation Iraqi Freedom (OIF), flying nearly 100 overland combat missions and over 4,000 flight hours from Italy, Greece, Germany, Spain, and Senegal.  This split-site deployment also included support to Operation Joint Guardian, Operation Deliberate Forge, Operation Enduring Freedom, and NATO Joint Command Lisbon.

Its second OIF deployment, starting December 2006, involved VP-8 operation out of Al Udeid Air Base in Qatar as part of Task Group 57.2, a maritime patrol and reconnaissance organization consisting of 22 aircrews and 21 aircraft.

Operation Unified Assistance
During its Western Pacific deployment to Misawa Air Base and Kadena Air Base, VP-8 participated in the U.S. military response to the aftermath of 2004 Indian Ocean earthquake (Operation Unified Assistance), sending the first U.S. military aircraft on station to the disaster area from to Utaphao, Thailand, and Diego Garcia, as well as flying Humanitarian Assistance/Disaster Relief (HADR) missions to the affected region.

P-8A Poseidon Transition
In July 2014 VP-8 started the transition from the P-3C to the P-8A Poseidon.

In March 2016, VP-8 began the squadron inaugural deployment of its P-8A Poseidon with a six-month deployment to Kadena AFB, Japan.

Japanese F-35 Crash
On 9 April 2019, VP-8 P-8A Poseidon's operating out of Misawa AB assist in the search of a Japan Air Self-Defense Force F-35A and its pilot, that crashed off the coast of Japan.

Awards & Commendations

Joint Meritorious Unit Award – 1990, 1991
Navy Unit Commendation - 1978, 1983, 1991, 2003
Meritorious Unit Commendation - 1970, 1971, 1977, 1979, 1983, 1986, 1997
Navy Expeditionary Medal - 1983
Coast Guard Unit Commendation - 1985
Southwest Asia Service Medal - 1991
Navy "E" Ribbon - 1950, 1960, 1962, 1983, 1991, 1997, 2000, 2007, 2014
CINCLANTFLT Golden Anchor Award - 1995, 2005
Isbell Trophy - 1962, 1984, 1986, 1988, 1996
U.S. Sixth Fleet "Hook 'em" Award - 1980, 1983, 1984, 1988, 1991
Golden Wrench Award for Maintenance - 2007, 2008, 2010, 2011, 2012
Arleigh Burke Fleet Trophy - 2014

Aircraft assignments
The squadron was assigned the following aircraft, effective on the dates shown:
PBM-3 - September 1942
PBM-3C - December 1942
PBM-3S - May 1943
PBM-5E - April 1945
P2V-2 - December 1947
P2V-3 - January 1949
P2V-5F - July 1955
P-3A - August 1962
P-3B - December 1965
P-3C UII - August 1981
P-3C UII.5 - September 1985
P-3C UIIIR - June 1994
P-8A Poseidon - July 2014

Home port assignments
The squadron was assigned to these home ports, effective on the dates shown:
Naval Air Station Norfolk, Virginia - 1 September 1942
NAS Banana River - 6 October 1942
Naval Air Station Norfolk - 6 February 1943
Naval Air Station Bermuda - August 1943
Naval Air Station Norfolk - 8 June 1944
Naval Air Station Key West, Florida - 27 July 1944
Naval Air Station Coco Solo, Panama Canal Zone - 29 May 1945
Naval Station San Juan, Puerto Rico - 15 March 1946
Naval Air Station Norfolk - December 1947
Naval Air Station Quonset Point, Rhode Island - September 1948
Naval Auxiliary Air Station Chincoteague, Virginia - April 1958
Naval Air Station Norfolk - July 1959
Naval Air Station Patuxent River, Maryland - July 1961
Naval Air Station Brunswick, Maine - July 1971
Naval Air Station Jacksonville, Florida

See also
 History of the United States Navy
 List of United States Navy aircraft squadrons
 List of squadrons in the Dictionary of American Naval Aviation Squadrons
 List of Lockheed P-3 Orion variants

Notes

Sources

External links
Official Web Site – U.S. Navy
VP-8 Alumni Association
VP-8 – U.S. Navy Patrol Squadrons – VPNavy.org
Patrol Squadron Eight – Globalsecurity.org
VP-8 Unit Page – Military.com
VP-8 Web Page – Tiger-Lair.org
VP-8 Web Page – NATO Tiger Association

Patrol squadrons of the United States Navy
Military units and formations in Maine